Kotex is an American  brand of menstrual hygiene products, which includes the Kotex maxi, thin and ultra thin pads, the Security tampons, and the Lightdays pantiliners. Most recently, the company has added U by Kotex to its line of menstrual hygiene products. Kotex is owned and managed by Kimberly-Clark, a consumer products corporation active in more than 80 countries.

History

The modern, commercial, disposable pads seem to have started in the late nineteenth century with the  company in Germany, and Johnson & Johnson in the United States. In the UK, the Birmingham firm of Southall Brothers & Barclay was advertising "sanitary towels" in The Family Doctor and Home Medical Adviser in the early 1890s.

In the United States, Kotex was launched in 1920 by Kimberly-Clark to make use of leftover cellucotton (wood pulp fiber) from World War One bandages. An employee noted that the pads had a "cotton-like texture" which was abbreviated to "cot-tex" and then made the product name with alternate spelling.

Kotex became well known in the 1920s after Kimberly-Clark placed advertisements in the women's magazines Good Housekeeping and Ladies' Home Journal. Although some readers were offended by the ads, the products' success led to more advertisements. Kimberly-Clark also promoted Kotex in Good Housekeeping by using intimate advice columnist Mary Pauline Callender.

Originally sold in a hospital blue box at 12 for 60 cents, Victorian sexual prudishness caused slow acceptance until Montgomery Ward began advertising them in its 1926 catalog, reaching $11 million sales in 1927 in 57 countries. It became one of the first self-service items in American retailing history after it was strategically placed on countertops with a special payment box so that the woman didn't have to ask a clerk for it and touch hands. Tampax appeared in 1936. Belts were needed until the 1970 introduction of Stayfree by Personal Products Co. and New Freedom Pads by Kimberly-Clark.

New Freedom is a former brand in the Kotex family. New Freedom was one of the first beltless pads manufactured in the early 1970s.

Product line
In August 2009 Kotex launched a premium sub-brand called Kotex Luxe in Singapore. It launched U by Kotex Tween, products aimed at girls aged 8–12 in the US in 2011.

Recalls and defects
In September 2012 Kimberly-Clark issued a warning regarding a shipment of rejected Kotex tampons that had been stolen and sold to the public.  The company said that the defective products posed only a minor health risk to consumers.

In December 2018, Kimberly-Clark issued a recall of U by Kotex Sleek tampons due to findings that the product would sometimes break apart during removal, leaving behind fragments in the body that could require medical attention for removal.

Notes

References

Further reading
 Guadagnolo, D. (2020). "“The Miracle of You”: Women's Sex Education and the Marketing of Kotex." Modern American History
 
  On the origin of Kotex sanitary napkins. Cites:

External links

 Kimberly-Clark corporate website
 Girlspace: Kotex website for teen girls
 U by Kotex USA
 U by Kotex English-Canada
 U by Kotex French-Canada

 Kotex Singapore
 Kotex in Russia

Feminine hygiene brands
Kimberly-Clark brands
Products introduced in 1920